Not So Quiet is a 1930 animated short film produced by Walter Lantz, and stars Oswald the Lucky Rabbit. The title is a parody of All Quiet on the Western Front, an Academy Award-winning Universal film released in the same year.

Plot
Oswald is a private and is sent into the battlefield. It is dawn and he dozes inside a tent. The general calls out to assemble the privates. Oswald anxiously comes out and gives salute. The general then gives the privates an exercise where they line up, carry a gun and march back and forth. In the drill, Oswald keeps toppling on the other privates, much to their annoyance. But all that is because the general carelessly gave him a gun that is too big and cumbersome.

While he is disappointed and wonders what penalty he'll receive, Oswald sees a girl cat singing him a serenade from the other side of a river. Oswald is fascinated and decides to meet her. But before he can cross the river, Oswald is approached by the general who orders him to deliver a note to the enemy general.

The rabbit agrees and goes on to carry the message. Untouchable, Oswald evades every single bullet that comes his way and hides behind things (such as tree stumps) for cover. At last, Oswald reaches the enemy general and hands the message. To his horror, Oswald realizes he was betrayed by his own general when the note tells the enemy leader to shoot him when the sun comes up. Oswald runs for his safety and has to pass through more obstacles. The two battling forces resort to larger ammunition, making escape very difficult.

The two forces finally agree to a cease-fire after several moments. Oswald is relieved of his worries. The girl cat from beyond the river comes to him and gives Oswald a kiss.

See also
 Oswald the Lucky Rabbit filmography

References

External links
 Not So Quiet at the Big Cartoon Database
 

1930 films
1930 animated films
1930s American animated films
1930s animated short films
1930s war films
American black-and-white films
Films directed by Walter Lantz
Oswald the Lucky Rabbit cartoons
Universal Pictures animated short films
Walter Lantz Productions shorts
American war films
Animated films about cats